Bliss, Please is the third studio album by the German alternative rock band Blackmail, released in 2001. The album is known for popular singles such as "Same Sane", "Ken I Die" and "A Reptile for the Saint". It also features Blackmail adopting the independent music genre through experimentation in their songs.

Track listing 

 "Data Buzz" – 2:44
 "Same Sane" (Album Version) – 3:45
 "Amelia" – 5:14
 "A Reptile for the Saint" – 5:03
 "For Shure" – 3:08
 "Emetic" – 2:54
 "By Any Method" – 4:38
 "Dee" – 0:47
 "The Small Saving Tar Pit" – 3:19
 "Frop" – 3:20
 "Ken I Die" – 4:10
 "Club 45" – 2:44
 "Sad Sauce" – 4:10
 "Permanently Temporary" – 6:22
 "Leave On" – 2:21
 "The Day The Earth Stood Still" – 6:43

Personnel 
Aydo Abay – vocals
Kurt Ebelhäuser – guitars, backing vocals, keyboards
Carlos Ebelhäuser – bass
Mario Matthias – drums

Charts

References

External links
 

Blackmail (band) albums
2001 albums